A fermentation lock or airlock is a device used in beer brewing and wine making that allows carbon dioxide released during fermentation to escape the fermenter, while not allowing air to enter the fermenter, thus avoiding oxidation.

There are two main designs for the fermentation lock. These designs work when half filled with water. When the pressure of the gas inside the fermentation vessel exceeds the prevailing atmospheric pressure the gas will push its way through the water as individual bubbles into the outside air. A sanitizing solution, sulphur dioxide or alcohol is sometimes placed in the fermentation lock to prevent contamination of the beverage in case the water is inadvertently drawn into the fermenter.

This device may take the form of a tube connected to the headspace of the fermenting vessel into a tub of sanitized liquid or a simpler device mounted directly on top of the fermentation vessel.

Currently, a popular fermentation lock that mounts on top of the fermentation vessel is the three-piece fermentation lock.  Other models contain three bulbous chambers allowing for a broader range of pressure equalization.  These bulbous fermentation locks were generally made of hand blown glass and are nowadays often made of clear plastic.

The use of perforated rubber balloons offers an easy and inexpensive alternative to conventional airlocks: as used primarily in homebrewing, the balloon is stretched over the orifice of the fermentation vessel and, if necessary, tightened with rubber bands. The balloon is then perforated with a needle. These punctures, while not completely airtight, sufficiently protect the vessel's contents from contamination and allow the gases produced by fermentation to evacuate from the vessel as the pressure rises and the balloon inflates.

See also 
Fermentation (wine)
Brewing#Fermenting
Harsch crock
Gas bubbler

References

Homebrewing